Contemporanul (The Contemporary) is a Romanian literary magazine published in Iaşi, Romania from 1881 to 1891. It was sponsored by the socialist circle of the city. 

A new magazine Contimporanul was published in the 1920s, claiming to continue the tradition of the former newspaper, without having the same political orientation towards Marxism.

A new series of the magazine was published in 1946 and continues till present.

External links
 Contemporanul
 Corneliu Senchea - Contemporanul, Trei reviste si un nume care implineste 125 de ani (History of Contemporanul on ideeaeuropeana.ro)

Mass media in Iași
Literary magazines published in Romania
Political magazines published in Romania
Magazines established in 1881
Magazines disestablished in 1891
1881 establishments in Romania
1891 disestablishments in Romania
Romanian-language magazines
Socialist magazines